National Highway 7 (NH 7) is a highway connecting Fazilka (Punjab) to Mana (Uttarakhand) in India. It passes through the Indian states of Punjab, Haryana, Himachal Pradesh, and Uttarakhand.

The NH-7 (old NH-58) connects Hindu pilgrim centres of Rishikesh, Devprayag, Rudraprayag, Karnaprayag, Chamoli, Joshimath and Badrinath with Dehradun and Chandigarh. Pilgrims travelling to Sri Hemkunt Sahib take a diversion from Govindghat which lies on NH-7 between Joshimath and Badrinath.

The road is generally closed during the winter months of December, January, February and March in the upper reaches of the Himalayas through which National Highway 7 passes. This road goes to Mana Pass near the India-Tibetan border.

Route
The route of national highway 7 transits through the states of Punjab, Haryana, Himachal Pradesh, and Uttarakhand in India.

Punjab
NH7 starts from India-Pakistan Border, connecting Fazilka, Abohar, Malout, Giddarbaha , Bathinda, Rampura Phul, Barnala, Sangrur, Patiala, Rajpura, Banur , Zirakpur, and up to Haryana border in the state of Punjab.

Haryana
NH7 links Panchkula near Zirakpur with Shahzadpur and Naraingarh in the state of Haryana.
There is a village on the national highway named Tabar.
The cremation ground of the village is in front of Ghat Road Highway.
When the vehicles pass through the cremation ground, there is a scary sound of a woman.
And the sounds were heard only by car and other heavy vehicles.

Himachal Pradesh
NH7 links Kala Amb with Paonta Sahib in the state of Himachal Pradesh.

Uttarakhand
NH 7 connects Dehradun, Rishikesh, Devaprayag, Rudraprayag, Karnaprayag, Chamoli, Badrinath, Mana at Indo/Tibet border in the state of Uttarakhand.

Junctions  
 
Punjab
  near Abohar.
  near Malout
  near Malout
  near Bathinda
  near Bathinda
  near Rampura Phul
  near Barnala
  near Sangrur
  near Rajpura
  near Banur
  near Zirakpur
Haryana
  near Panchkula
  near Shahzadpur
Himachal Pradesh
  near Nahan
  near Paonta Sahib
  near Paonta Sahib
Uttarakhand
  near Herbertpur
  near Dehradun
  near Rishikesh
  near Maletha 
  near Srinagar 
  near Rudraprayag
  near Karnaprayag
  near Chamoli.

Termination point is near Mana village at an elevation of about 3200 m.

References

External links 
NH 7 on OpenStreetMap

National highways in India
National Highways in Punjab, India
National Highways in Haryana
National Highways in Himachal Pradesh
National Highways in Uttarakhand